Willie McMeans is an American former Negro league pitcher who played in the 1940s.

McMeans played for the Chicago American Giants in 1945. In 11 recorded games played, he made five appearances on the mound, posting a 5.96 ERA over 22.2 innings.

References

External links
 and Seamheads

Year of birth missing
Place of birth missing
Chicago American Giants players
Baseball pitchers